16th Congress may refer to:

 16th Congress of the All-Union Communist Party (Bolsheviks) (1930)
 16th Congress of the Philippines (2013–2016)
 16th National Congress of the Chinese Communist Party (2002)
 16th National Congress of the Kuomintang (2001)
 16th United States Congress (1819–1821)